Trishna Gurung (Nepali: तृष्णा गुरुङ, born 28 September 1985) is a Nepali singer and also a coach of The Voice of Nepal Season 3, a reality show. She sang popular numbers including the title song of Maya Pirati, Khani ho yahmu, Gaine Dajaile , Khani ho yamu etc. songs.

Music career
Trishna Gurung is a young Composer, Singer and Lyricist of Nepal Music Industry. Her most popular song is Maya Pirati uploaded on YouTube. She started her music career in 2007 and her first song Daiba Janos in 2007.

Awards

 Hits Fm music award(2018) - BEST FEMALE POP VOCAL PERFORMANCE - Nominated
 Radio Kantipur music award (2018) -  Best Pop Singer (Female) - Nominated

Famous songs
Few Famous Songs of Trishna Gurung

Timi ra Ma...
Gurasai Fulyo...
Relaima...
Timro Mero Prem...
Sajhako Bela...
Gaine Dajaile...
Maya Pirati...
Khani Ho Yamu...
Sanjha Ko Bela...

References

Living people
Nepalese playback singers
21st-century Nepalese women singers
Place of birth missing (living people)
1984 births
People from Rupandehi District
Gurung people